Forgive Them For They Suck K*k is the first live album by Punk rock band Fokofpolisiekar. It was recorded in 2012 during the band's performance at the Barnyard Theatre in the Cresta Mall, Johannesburg. The name of the DVD was chosen after Wynand Myburgh jokingly remarked that if a follow DVD was made to their 2009 documentary Forgive Them For They Know Not What They Do, it should be called Forgive Them For They Suck K*k; Myburgh elaborated by saying "We do not take ourselves too seriously in Fokofpolisiekar".

Track listing

References 

2013 live albums
Fokofpolisiekar albums